Women on the Run (Traditional Chinese: 窈窕熟女) is a TVB modern drama series broadcast in July 2005 to February 2006 on Sundays.

Synopsis
Four beautiful and successful ladies, and a mean, but brilliant detective,
Explore the mysterious world of modern women.

Cast

Episode 1

Episode 2

Episode 3

Episode 4

Episode 5

Episode 6

Episode 7

Episode 8

Episode 9

Episode 10

Episode 11-

Viewership ratings

References

External links
TVB.com Women on the Run - Official Website 

TVB dramas
2005 Hong Kong television series debuts
2006 Hong Kong television series endings